A maid of honour is a junior attendant of a queen in royal households. The position was and is junior to the lady-in-waiting. The equivalent title and office has historically been used in most European royal courts.

Role
Traditionally, a queen regnant had eight maids of honour, while a queen consort had four; Queen Anne Boleyn, however, had over 60.

A maid of honour was a maiden, meaning that she had never been married (and therefore was ostensibly a virgin), and was usually young and a member of the nobility. Maids of honour were commonly in their sixteenth year or older, although Lady Jane Grey served as a maid of honour to Queen Catherine Parr in about 1546–48, when Jane was only about ten to twelve years old. Under Mary I and Elizabeth I, maids of honour were at court as a kind of finishing school, with the hope of making a good marriage. Elizabeth Knollys was a maid of the court at the age of nine.

Some of the maids of honour were paid, while others were not. In the 19th and 20th centuries, the term maid of honour in waiting was sometimes used.

The queen mother often also had maids of honour. In 1912, for example, Ivy Gordon-Lennox was appointed a maid of honour to Queen Alexandra.

In 1912, King George V granted maids of honour the style of The Honourable, with precedence next after daughters of barons.

At her coronation, Queen Elizabeth II had six maids of honour who attended her throughout the ceremony, especially carrying the trains of her robes. They were:

 Lady Moyra Hamilton, daughter of James Hamilton, Marquess of Hamilton;
 Lady Anne Coke, daughter of Thomas Coke, 5th Earl of Leicester;
 Lady Jane Vane-Tempest-Stewart, daughter of Robin Vane-Tempest-Stewart, 8th Marquess of Londonderry;
 Lady Mary Baillie-Hamilton, daughter of George Baillie-Hamilton, 12th Earl of Haddington;
 Lady Jane Heathcote-Drummond-Willoughby, daughter of James Heathcote-Drummond-Willoughby, 3rd Earl of Ancaster; and 
 Lady Rosemary Spencer-Churchill, daughter of John Spencer-Churchill, 10th Duke of Marlborough.

Terminology
A lady-in-waiting is a woman who attends a female member of the Royal Family other than the queen regnant or queen consort. An attendant upon one of the latter is a Lady of the Bedchamber or Woman of the Bedchamber, and the senior lady-in-waiting is the Mistress of the Robes. The women of the bedchamber are in regular attendance, but the mistress of the robes and the ladies of the bedchamber are normally only required for ceremonial occasions.

At the Tudor and Stuart courts, the women in attendance included gentlewomen, maids of honour, and chamberers.

The term maid of honour is the origin of the American English term maid of honor, usually the best friend of a bride who leads her bridal party.

References

Positions within the British Royal Household